The Serbia men's national water polo team represents Serbia in international water polo competitions and is controlled by the . They have won gold medals in the Olympics, World and European Championships, World Cup, FINA World League, Mediterranean Games and Universiade, making them one of the most successful men's water polo teams in the world.

They are Serbia's most successful national team, having won more titles than all other Serbian national teams combined. In 2016, they became the first team to hold titles in all five existing major championships: European Championship, World Championship, World Cup, World League and Olympic Games simultaneously.

Competitive record

Medals
Includes matches of Serbia and Montenegro and Serbia.

Updated after the 2022 Mediterranean Games

Olympic Games

World Championship

World Cup

World League

European Championship

Europa Cup

Mediterranean Games

Team

Current squad
Roster for the 2020 Summer Olympics.

Coaches

 1992–1999 Nikola Stamenić
 1999–2004 Nenad Manojlović
 2004–2006 Petar Porobić
 2006–2012 Dejan Udovičić
 2012–2022 Dejan Savić
 2022– present Uroš Stevanović

Most appearances and goals

Professional friendly and competitive matches only where Yugoslavia, Serbia and Montenegro and now Serbia were represented.

Statistics accurate as of matches played 6 August 2021

Philanthropy
On 25 December 2011, Serbia's water polo team was included in a humanitarian action "Bitka za Bebe" ("the Battle for the Babies") playing an exhibition match with the team of the Faculty of Organizational Sciences (FON), in Belgrade. Before the Serbian water polo team had joined the action, many other athletes were included. Among them was the world number one in tennis at that time, Novak Djokovic, football and basketball players of Red Star Belgrade, and many others. Proceeds from the ticket sales went to fund "Bitka za Bebe" and enough money was successfully raised to purchase one incubator.

See also
 Serbia men's Olympic water polo team records and statistics
 Yugoslavia men's national water polo team
 Serbia and Montenegro men's national water polo team
 List of Olympic champions in men's water polo
 List of men's Olympic water polo tournament records and statistics
 List of world champions in men's water polo

References

External links

 

 
Men's national water polo teams
Men's sport in Serbia